Maceo Parker (born February 14, 1943) is an American funk and soul jazz saxophonist, best known for his work with James Brown in the 1960s, Parliament-Funkadelic in the 1970s and Prince in the 2000s.  Parker was a prominent soloist on many of Brown's hit recordings, and a key part of his band, playing alto, tenor and baritone saxophones. Since the early 1990s, he has toured under his own name.

Biography
Parker was born in Kinston, North Carolina, United States. Parker's father played piano and drums in addition to singing in church with Parker's mother; his brother Melvin played drums and his brother Kellis played the trombone. Parker and his brother Melvin joined James Brown in 1964; in his autobiography, Brown claims that he originally wanted Melvin as his drummer, but agreed to additionally take Maceo under his wing as part of the deal. In March 1970, Parker, his brother Melvin, and a few of Brown's band members left to establish the band Maceo & All the King's Men, which toured for two years.

In January 1973, Parker rejoined James Brown's group. He also charted a single "Parrty – Part I" (No. 71 pop singles) with Maceo & the Macks that year. In 1975, Parker and some of Brown's band members, including Fred Wesley, left to join George Clinton's band Parliament-Funkadelic. Parker once again re-joined James Brown from 1984 to 1988.

In the 1990s, Parker began a solo career. His first album of this period Roots Revisited spent 10 weeks at the top of the Billboard  Contemporary Jazz Charts.  To date he has released 11 solo albums since 1990. His band has been billed as "the greatest little funk orchestra on earth" and the "million-dollar support band". Parker's 1992 live album, Life on Planet Groove, is considered to be his seminal live album, marking his first collaboration with Dutch saxophonist Candy Dulfer.

In 1993, Parker made guest appearances on hip hop group De La Soul's album Buhloone Mindstate. In the late 1990s, Parker began contributing semi-regularly to recordings by Prince and accompanying his band, The New Power Generation, on tour. He also played on the Jane's Addiction track "My Cat's Name Is Maceo" for their 1997 compilation album Kettle Whistle. In 1998, Parker performed as a guest on "What Would You Say" on a Dave Matthews Band concert, which also became one of their live albums, Live in Chicago 12.19.98.

In 2004, Parker toured as a part of Prince's band for the "Musicology Live 2004ever" tour and again in 2007 he performed as part of Prince's band for Prince's 21 nights at the O2 arena. Parker also played as part of Prince's band for his 21-night stay at LA's Forum in 2011.

In 2008, Maceo Parker closed the Edmonton International Jazz Festival at Urban Lounge.

Parker's album Roots & Grooves with the WDR Big Band is a tribute to Ray Charles, whom Parker cites as one of his most important influences. The album won a Jammie for best Jazz Album in 2009. Parker followed this up with another collaboration with WDR Big Band in 2012 with the album Soul Classics.

In October 2011, Parker was inducted in the North Carolina Music Hall of Fame.

In July 2012, Parker was the recipient of a Lifetime Achievement Award from  Victoires Du Jazz in Paris. He continues touring, headlining many jazz festivals in Europe and doing as many as 290 concerts a year.

In May 2016, Parker received The North Carolina Heritage Award from his home state.

Book and media
In February 2013, Maceo Parker published his autobiography, 98% Funky Stuff: My Life in Music with the publisher Chicago Review Press. Parker was portrayed by Craig Robinson in the 2014 James Brown biopic Get on Up.

Equipment
Maceo plays a gold-plated Selmer Mark VI alto saxophone and the mouthpiece he uses is a #3 Brilhart Ebolin. Maceo's reed of choice is the Vandoren Java, 3.5 gauge.

Discography

As bandleader

As sideman

Filmography

References

External links 
 Maceo Parker official website
 
 

1943 births
Living people
People from Kinston, North Carolina
Soul-jazz musicians
African-American saxophonists
American funk saxophonists
American male saxophonists
American jazz saxophonists
American bandleaders
James Brown Orchestra members
The J.B.'s members
P-Funk members
New Power Generation members
Heads Up International artists
21st-century saxophonists
Jazz musicians from North Carolina
American male jazz musicians
Verve Records artists
Jive Records artists
P-Vine Records artists